Bulach Tatu (Avar: Тату Булач, Russian: Тату Омаровна Булач, 1902–1980) was a participant in the struggle for the establishment of Soviet power in Dagestan and the first Komsomol woman in Dagestan.

Biography 
She was born in the village of Nizhneye Kazanishche in the family of an officer of the tsarist army. Her father Bulach died suddenly at the age of 30, leaving a widow Aruv Azhay, a daughter Izumrud, a son Haji and a six month old Tatu. The family was poor, so Tatu had to work from the age of 13. She combined her work with her studies at the Temir-Khan-Shura Women's Gymnasium.

In the summer of 1915, when Tatu was 13 years old, her brother's friend Ullubiy Buynaksky came to visit their family. He became a frequent visitor to the Bulache family. Already after the revolution, after the arrest of Ullubiy, through Tata he sent letters to freedom and also corresponded with her. In these hundreds of years old letters, against the backdrop of revolution and civil war, among the calls to fight to the bitter end, a tragic love story unfolds. During the difficult years of the civil war Tatu Bulach worked actively for the victory of Soviet power in Dagestan and enjoyed great respect among the red partisans.

In the spring of 1917, she became chairman of the Union of Revolutionary Muslim Youth, which united the student and working youth of the city. Soon she became a delegate to the first all-Caucasian congress of Muslim students, which was held in Baku in May 1917. She was the only one of the three female delegates elected as a member of the presidium of the congress.
In 1920, Tatu Bulach was elected chairman of the organizing bureau of the All-Union Leninist Young Communist League for the preparation of a conference or congress of the Komsomol of Dagestan. In 1920-1921 she was elected a member of the Presidium of the Youth Council of the East, then she worked as a secretary of the Khasavyurt Communist Party of the Soviet Union and in the Makhachkala Dagestan Autonomous Soviet Socialist Republic.

In 1927 she graduated from the Plekhanov Russian University of Economics, after which she worked as an intern-referent in the People's Commissariat for Foreign Trade of the State Trade Committee of the USSR. In 1928–1929 she worked as an economist, and secretary of the export-import department of the USSR Trade Representation in Istanbul.

In 1932–1933 she studied at the Institute of Red Professors. In 1934 she worked at the Central Executive Committee of the Soviet Union under the Soviet of Nationalities as director of advanced training courses.

In 1935–1936 she worked as the director of the evening Academy. In 1937 – head of the department of educational institutions of the People's Commissariat of Nationalities of the RSFSR.

Repression 
Then her life activity was interrupted, she was repressed for several years. The Soviet repressive system did not bypass her, one of the most active builders of communism in Dagestan. In 1937, she was arrested by the NKVD on charges of participating in a Trotskyist organization, and was convicted under Art. 58 p. 11 of the Criminal Code of the RSFSR (participation in counter-revolutionary activities) for 8 years of labor camp. She served her sentence in the Karaganda Corrective Labor Camp. She was released in 1946, But freedom did not last long: in 1948 she was again arrested on charges of espionage and transported to the Krasnoyarsk, then deported to the city of Yeniseisk. In 1955, accusations with Bulach Tatu were removed. In total she spent 16 years in prison, camps and exile.

On December 31, 1955, she was rehabilitated due to the lack of corpus delicti. On December 31, 1955, she was rehabilitated due to the lack of corpus delicti. She died in 1980 at the age of 78 and was buried in Makhachkala.

See also 

 Mashidat Gairbekova

 Dagestan ASSR
 Soviet of Nationalities

References

External links 

 "Youth Leaders. Tatu Bulach"
 "Daughter of the Revolution. To the 120th anniversary of the birth of Bulach Tatu" – www.cgard.ru.
 Bulach Hajiyev. Tatu Bulach
 Tatu Bulach – Names of the Caucasus

1902 births
1980 deaths
Soviet military personnel of the Russian Civil War
Communist Party of the Soviet Union members
Russian Social Democratic Labour Party members
Avar people
Dagestani politicians